Kalali may refer to:

Places
Kalali, Pakpattan, Kalali village, Pakpattan city, Punjab Pakistan
Kalali, Vadodara, Kalali village, Vadodara city, Gujarat India
Ghukasavan, Armenia
Noraber, Armenia
Kalali, Iran
Kalaleh-ye Sofla, Iran

Other
 Kalali people, an indigenous Australian people
 Amirteymour Kalali (1895–1988), Iranian politician and noble